Gundelfingen an der Donau is a town in the Bavarian district Dillingen in Swabia. Gundelfingen is located at the river Danube (Donau), between Stuttgart, Munich and Augsburg (latitude 48° 33" 15' and longitude: 10° 22" 9'). It has some 8,000 inhabitants and still resembles the town of the Middle Ages. The town is the seat of the municipal association Gundelfingen an der Donau, which includes the towns Bächingen, Haunsheim and Medlingen.

References

External links
 Web site of Gundelfingen-an-der-Donau (German)

Dillingen (district)
Populated places on the Danube